Matthew Riddle, also called Matt Riddle, is a mixed martial artist and wrestler.

Matthew Riddle or Matt Riddle may also refer to:
 Matthew Ball Riddle (1871–1969), American politician
 Matthew Brown Riddle (1836–1916), American theologian
 Matt Riddle (musician) (born 1967), American musician
 Matt Riddle (rugby league) (born 1983), Australian rugby league player